Panorhynchus is a monotypic genus of worms belonging to the monotypic family Panorhynchidae. The only species is Panorhynchus argentinensis.

References

Monotypic nemertea genera
Heteronemertea
Nemertea genera